The Sukkalmah Dynasty (c. 1900-1500 BCE), also Epartid Dynasty after the founder Eparti/Ebarat, was an early dynasty of West Asia in the ancient region of Elam, to the southeast of Babylonia. It corresponds to the latest part of the Old Elamite period (dated c. 2700-1600 BC).

The Sukkalmah dynasty followed the Shimashki Dynasty (c. 2200-1900 BCE). The name of the dynasty comes from the name Sukkalmah meaning "Grand Regent", the title used by Elamite rulers.

Numerous cuneiform documents and inscriptions remain from this period, particularly from the area of Susa, making the Sukkalmah period one of the best documented in Elamite history.

Origin of the title "Sukkalmah"

Sukkalmah was a Sumerian title first attested in the Pre-Sargonic texts from Girsu, where it seems to have had the meaning of "prime minister" or "grand vizier." The title was well-attested under the powerful Ur III state, where it remained associated with Girsu and nearby Lagash. The Sukkalmahs of Lagash held effective control over the entire ma-da or buffer zone to the north and east of the Ur III core territory, and thus held authority over Susa. The Sukkalmah Arad-Nanna held the title of shagina or military governor of Pashime on the southern coast of Iran, indicating that the influence of the Neo-Sumerian Sukkalmahs could extend quite deep into Elamite territory. The later adoption of the title Sukkalmah by the Elamites probably reflects the considerable political influence that the Neo-Sumerian Sukkalmahs had on Susiana and Elam, and may have also been favored due to similarity between the Sumerian sukkal and the Elamite title sunkir or sukkir meaning "king".

The dynasty
The founder of the dynasty was a ruler named Shilhaha, who described himself as "the chosen son of Ebarat", who may have been the same as King Ebarti mentioned as the 9th King of the Shimashki Dynasty. Ebarat appears as the founder of the dynasty according to building inscriptions, but later kings rather seem to refer to Shilhaha in their filiation claims.

The dynasty was roughly contemporary with the Old Assyrian period, and the Old Babylonian period in Mesopotamia. During this time, Susa was under Elamite control, but Akkadian-speaking Mesopotamian states such as Larsa and Isin continually tried to retake the city. Notable Sukkalmah dynasty rulers in Elam during this time include Sirukdukh (c. 1850), who entered into various military coalitions to contain the power of the south Mesopotamian states; Siwe-Palar-Khuppak, who for some time was the most powerful person in the area, respectfully addressed as "Father" by Amorite Mesopotamian kings such as Zimrilim of Mari, Shamshi-Adad I of Assyria, and even Hammurabi of Babylon; and Kudur-Nahhunte, who plundered the temples of southern Mesopotamia. But Elamite influence in southern Mesopotamia did not last. Around 1760 BC, Hammurabi drove out the Elamites, overthrew Rim-Sin of Larsa, and established a Babylonian Empire in Mesopotamia. Little is known about the later part of this dynasty, since sources again become sparse with the Kassite rule of Babylon (from c. 1595).

Gunagi vessels
The names of Ebarat and Shilhaha, the founding members of the Sukkalmah Dynasty, have been found on the Gunagi silver vessels, inscribed in the Linear Elamite script. The Gunagi vessels were discovered recently (2004). French archaeologist François Desset identified repetitive sign sequences in the beginning of the Gunagi inscriptions, and guessed they were names of Kings, in a manner somewhat similar to Grotefend's decipherment of Old Persian cuneiform in 1802-1815. Using the small set of letters identified in 1905-1912, the number of symbols in each sequence taken as syllables, and in one instance the repetition of a symbol, Desset was able to identify the only two contemporary historical rulers that matched these conditions: Shilhaha and Ebarat, the two earliest kings of the Sukkalmah Dynasty. Another set of signs matched the well-known God of the period: Napirisha:
  E-b-r-t, Ebarat II, founder of the Sukkalmah Dynasty.
  Shi-l-ha-ha, Shilhaha, second king of the Sukkalmah Dynasty.
   Na-pi-r-ri-sha, God Napirisha.

Artifacts of the Sukkalmah

Rulers

See also

Awan dynasty
List of rulers of Elam

References

Sources
 Cameron, George, "History of Early Iran", Chicago, 1936 (repr., Chicago, 1969; tr. E.-J. Levin, L’histoire de l’Iran antique, Paris, 1937; tr. H. Anusheh, ایران در سپیده دم تاریخ, Tehran, 1993)
 Potts, D. T., The Archaeology of Elam, Cambridge University Press, 1999.

Elamite kings
Sukkalmah Dynasty